Eupithecia tricolorata is a moth in the family Geometridae first described by Samuel E. Cassino in 1927. It is found in the United States in southern Arizona.

The wingspan is about 17 mm. A large portion of the forewings and certain portions of the hindwings are brick red. Adults have been recorded on wing in October.

References

Moths described in 1927
tricolorata
Moths of North America